is a passenger railway station located in the city of Kusatsu, Shiga Prefecture, Japan, operated by the West Japan Railway Company (JR West). It is sometimes popularly referred to simply as "Minakusa"

Lines

Station layout
The station consists of two island platforms connected by an elevated station building. The station has a Midori no Madoguchi staffed ticket office.

Platforms

Adjacent stations

History
The station opened on 4 September 1994, following a successful petition for its construction by Kusatsu. The city contributed about ¥3 billion of the total ¥30 billion costs of construction. The station has stimulated urban growth in the surrounding area, especially after the opening of Ritsumeikan University's Biwako-Kusatsu Campus (BKC) in 1994.

Station numbering was introduced to the station in March 2018 with Minami-Kusatsu being assigned station number JR-A25.

Passenger statistics
In fiscal 2019, the station was used by an average of 30,443 passengers (boarding passengers only) in 2019, making it the 26th-busiest station by traffic in the West Japan Railway Company's network.

Surrounding area
 Kusatsu General Hospital
Kusatsu Municipal Senior High School
Omi Kusatsu Tokushukai Hospital
Ritsumeikan University Biwako Kusatsu Campus 
Shiga University of Medical Science
 Shiga Prefectural Tamagawa High School

See also
List of railway stations in Japan

References

External links

JR West official home page
"JR West Japan 2020, as seen by data". West Japan Railway Company (in Japanese). Retrieved August 10, 2021.

Railway stations in Japan opened in 1994
Tōkaidō Main Line
Railway stations in Shiga Prefecture
Kusatsu, Shiga